Nuclear Dawn is a post-apocalyptic first-person shooter real-time strategy hybrid video game. It was originally announced in February 2006 as an amateur mod for the Source engine, but in April 2009 was revealed to have become a commercial project, still using Source, aimed at Windows PCs and Mac OS X. It was released on September 26, 2011.

Gameplay 
One player on each team is a 'commander', who directs the team from an overhead view. The remainder are soldiers who have standard FPS player capabilities. Drivable vehicles were originally planned, however this was cut due to issues.

Development 

Nuclear Dawn suffered a protracted development cycle as a mod, leading to criticism that it was vaporware.

Reception 

Reviews of the game have been generally favorable, with a Metacritic rating of 71.

References

External links 

 Official homepage

First-person shooters
Real-time strategy video games
First-person strategy video games
Source (game engine) games
2011 video games
Linux games
Windows games
MacOS games
Video games with Steam Workshop support
Video games developed in the Netherlands
Iceberg Interactive games